Ryen is a variety of the English given name Ryan and a Norwegian surname. Notable people with it include:

Given name 
Ryen Russillo (born 1975), American sports journalist
Ryen Slegr (born 1979), American musician

Surname 
Annar Ryen (1909–1985), Norwegian cross-country skier
Anton Ryen (1894–1968), Norwegian politician
Brit Vingelsgaard Ryen (born 1944), Norwegian politician
Grethe Ryen (1949–2020), Norwegian actress
Kai Olav Ryen (born 1978), Norwegian footballer
Jan van Ryen ( 1620s–1630s), Dutch explorer
Richard Ryen (1885–1965), Hungarian-American actor
Tore Ryen (born 1946–2020), Norwegian writer
Christopher Ryen, American physician 
Katherine Ryen, American novelist

See also

Ryen, an Oslo neighbourhood